Puma pumoides is an extinct prehistoric cat that was described in 1956 by Alfredo Castellanos using the scientific name Felis pumoides. Castellanos excavated its fossil remains in the Reartes Valley located in the province of Córdoba, Argentina, in a stratum called 'Brocherense bed', which probably dates to the Pliocene.
Fossil remains comprised a maxilla, the orbital section of the frontal bone, a part of a mandible, a petrosal, a femur, a lumbar vertebrae, and a few parts of each a humerus, tibia, ulna, and radius. Because of the similarity of these holotype parts with jaguarundi, it was preliminarily subordinated to the genus Puma.

References

Prehistoric felines
pumoides
Prehistoric mammals of South America
Mammals described in 1956
Pliocene carnivorans
Neogene Argentina